Balkan is a Turkish origin surname. People with the surname include:

People
 Adele Balkan (1907–1999), American costume designer
 Enver Balkan (1902–1966), Turkish Olympic fencer
 Franco Balkan, stage name of Goran Valka (born 1983), Bosnian musical artist
 Fuat Balkan (1887–1970), Turkish Olympic fencer
 Liza Balkan (born 20th century), Canadian academic and actress
 Nihat Balkan (1921–?), Turkish Olympic fencer
 Onur Balkan (born 1996), Turkish cyclist
 Orkan Balkan (born 1987), Turkish football player
 Serkan Balkan (born 1994), Turkish cyclist

Fictional characters
 Boris Balkan, one of the main characters in the movie The Ninth Gate

Turkish-language surnames